Petr Jákl Sr. (born 16 December 1941) is a Czech judoka. He competed in the men's middleweight event at the 1972 Summer Olympics. His son, Petr, also competed at the 2000 Summer Olympics.

References

External links
 

1941 births
Living people
Czech male judoka
Olympic judoka of Czechoslovakia
Judoka at the 1972 Summer Olympics
Place of birth missing (living people)